Jakub Wrąbel (born 8 June 1996) is a Polish footballer who plays as a goalkeeper for Widzew Łódź.

External links

References

1996 births
Sportspeople from Wrocław
Living people
Association football goalkeepers
Polish footballers
Poland youth international footballers
Poland under-21 international footballers
Śląsk Wrocław players
Olimpia Grudziądz players
Wisła Płock players
Stal Mielec players
Widzew Łódź players
Ekstraklasa players
I liga players
III liga players